= Tigadolli =

- Village
- Location in Karnataka, India Tigadolli (India)
- Coordinates: 15°36′24.6″N 74°43′13.5″E
- Country: India
- State: Karnataka
- District: Belgaum

Languages
  - Official: Kannada
- Time zone: UTC+5:30 (IST)

Tigadolli is a village in Belgaum district of Karnataka, India.
